Mata (also Romanized as Maţā‘ and Matā; also known as Mogh Matā) is a village in Esmaili Rural District, Esmaili District, Anbarabad County, Kerman Province, Iran. At the 2006 census, its population was 79, in 16 families.

References 

Populated places in Anbarabad County